The enzyme acetylenedicarboxylate decarboxylase catalyzes the chemical reaction

acetylenedicarboxylate + H2O  pyruvate + CO2

This enzyme belongs to the family of lyases, specifically the carboxy-lyases, which cleave carbon-carbon bonds.  The systematic name of this enzyme class is acetylenedicarboxylate carboxy-lyase (pyruvate-forming). Other names in common use include acetylenedicarboxylate hydratase, acetylenedicarboxylate hydrase, and acetylenedicarboxylate carboxy-lyase. This enzyme participates in pyruvate metabolism.

References 

 

EC 4.1.1
Enzymes of unknown structure